1990 in television may refer to:

1990 in American television
1990 in Australian television
1990 in Belgian television
1990 in Brazilian television
1990 in British television
1990 in Canadian television
1990 in Danish television
1990 in Dutch television
1990 in German television
1990 in Indonesian television
1990 in Irish television
1990 in Italian television
1990 in Japanese television
1990 in New Zealand television
1990 in Norwegian television
1990 in Philippine television
1990 in Portuguese television
1990 in Scottish television
1990 in South African television
1990 in Swedish television